Katherine Justice (born October 28, 1942) is an American actress with many television guest star roles in the 1960s on through the 1980s and a few major film roles.

She had a leading role in the made-for-TV movie, Columbo: Prescription Murder (1968), which later became the popular television mystery series Columbo.

She played the recurring role of Sheila Hogan in Falcon Crest starting in 1982. She portrayed Rita Jones in the syndicated drama Dangerous Women (1991).

Early life and education
Justice was born and grew up in Ohio. She briefly was the 1960 Miss Ohio Universe, but wasn't able to compete in the Miss Universe competition when it was discovered she was 17, under the minimum 18 year age limit. Justice graduated from Carnegie Tech Drama School in 1964.

Career

After graduating, Justice went to the Front Street Theater in Memphis for the summer of 1964. From there she performed at Washington's Arena Stage starring as Lola in Damn Yankees, and in other plays like He Who Gets Slapped, Heartbreak House and Hard Travelin'''. Then for the summer of 1965, she toured with a summer stock company doing Nobody Loves an Albatross.

Justice's first television role was on The Big Valley in 1966. Before she even left the TV studio, she got a major part in the movie The Way West starring Kirk Douglas, Robert Mitchum, and Richard Widmark. Before the release of that movie, she was the mistress and accomplice (third billing) in the made-for-TV movie Prescription: Murder starring Peter Falk as Columbo and Gene Barry as the murderer. Her next movie role was the second female lead in 5 Card Stud with Dean Martin and Robert Mitchum starring. Dailies of her convinced Paramount Pictures to sign her for a five-year contract to make five pictures.

On March 14, 1967, she was a guest star on the science fiction television series The Invaders portraying a past love in the season one episode, "The Innocents". She guest starred again in 1968 in the season two episode "The Possessed".

She guest starred in the TV Western series Gunsmoke four times, including the 1971 three part episode, "The Bullet", and as a dance hall girl pretending to be a dying gunfighter's dead daughter in the 1970 episode, "Luke" (S16E8).

She guest starred on Cannon as Meg, S1:E19 - "Blood on the Vine", airing January 18, 1972.

She guest starred on Mannix as Ellen, S4:E13 - "Duet for Three", airing December 19, 1970, and as Holly, S8:E19 - "Quartet for Blunt Instrument", airing February 22, 1975.

Partial filmographyThe Big Valley (1966, TV Series) - MelanieThe Way West (1967) - Amanda MackJudd, for the Defense (1967, TV Series) - Wendy LukasThe Invaders (1967-1968, TV Series) - Janet Garner / HelenThe F.B.I. (1967-1972, TV Series) - Ellen Conway / Laurel Wyant / Uli RimColumbo: Prescription Murder (1968, TV Movie) - Joan Hudson5 Card Stud (1968) - Nora EversThe Virginian (1968, TV Series) - Ruby FrenchGunsmoke (1969-1972, TV Series) - Beth Tilton / Clarabelle Callahan / Doris Prebble / Lydia FletcherMannix (1969-1975, TV Series) - Holly Warlock / Ellen Gray / Maggie WellsNanny and the Professor (1971, TV Series) - Laurel FieldingThe Stepmother (1972) - Margo DelgadoMarcus Welby, M.D. (1972, TV Series) - Morgan EllisLimbo (1972) - Sharon DornbeckCannon (1972-1976, TV Series) - Julie Foster / Liza Carter / Meg WarrenBarnaby Jones (1973-1977, TV Series) - Libby Price / Suzanne Montaigne / Shirley Jennings / Liza MillsHawaii Five-O (1974)The Streets of San Francisco (1974, TV Series) - Katherine WallachPolice Woman (1975-1978, TV Series) - Karen Walters / Mary Ann WebsterQuinn Martin's Tales of the Unexpected (1977, TV Series) - BarbaraCaptain America II: Death Too Soon (1979, TV Movie) - Helen MooreQuincy, M.E. (1981-1982, TV Series) - Annie O'Connor / Holly MahoneySeparate Ways (1981) - SheilaFalcon Crest (1982-1983, TV Series) - Sheila HoganT. J. Hooker (1983-1984, TV Series) - Dr. Joan WagnerBlue Thunder (1984, TV Series) - Kate CunninghamSimon & Simon (1985, TV Series) - Donna BertolliAlien Nation (1989, TV Series) - Dr. Marcie WrightDallas (1991, TV Series) - Alice KingdomDangerous Women'' (1991-1992, TV Series) - Rita Jones / Roxy Lawrence

References

External links

Katherine Justice | Biography and Filmography on Hollywood.com

1942 births
American film actresses
American television actresses
Living people
20th-century American actresses
21st-century American women